Phaeocollybia festiva is a species of fungus in the family Cortinariaceae.

References 

Cortinariaceae
Fungi described in 1942